Tripolis, formerly Ischopolis (Ἰσχόπολις), was an ancient fortress city in Pontus Polemoniacus (aka the Pontus region), on a river of the same name, and with a tolerably good harbour; it is now the site and namesake of the city of Tirebolu in Giresun Province, Black Sea Region, Turkey. It belonged to the Mossynoeci and was situated at a distance of 18 km east from Cape Zephyrium. The place is situated on a rocky headland.

References

External links
 Hazlitt, Classical Gazetteer, "Tripolis"

Geography of ancient Anatolia
Populated places in ancient Pontus
Former populated places in Turkey
History of Giresun Province